Feed or The Feed may refer to:

Animal foodstuffs 
 Animal feed, food given to domestic animals in the course of animal husbandry
 Fodder, foodstuffs manufactured for animal consumption
 Forage, foodstuffs that animals gather themselves, such as by grazing
 Compound feed, foodstuffs that are blended from various raw materials and additives

Arts, entertainment, and media

Comedy
 A straight man who 'feeds' lines to the funny man in a comic dialogue

Film
 Feed (2005 film), a 2005 film directed by Brett Leonard
 Feed (2017 film), a 2017 film directed by Tommy Bertelsen

Literature
 Feed (Anderson novel), a 2002 novel by M. T. Anderson
 Feed (Grant novel), a 2010 novel by Seanan McGuire under the name "Mira Grant"

Music
 "Feed Us", 2007 song by Serj Tankian from Elect the Dead
 "Feed", 2022 song by Demi Lovato from Holy Fvck

Online media
 Feed Magazine, one of the earliest e-zines that relied entirely on its original online content
 "The Feed", video game news and blogs, published by G4 Media, an NBCUniversal subsidiary
 Web feed or news feed, a data format used for providing users with frequently updated content
 Feed (Facebook), a web feed on the social networking site

Television
 The Feed (Australian TV series), an Australian news TV series
 The Feed (British TV series), a 2019 psychological thriller drama television series
 The Feed, a recurring segment on the American TV series Attack of the Show!

Video games
 In video game terminology, to die repeatedly

Computing and telecommunications 
 Antenna feed, the components of an antenna which feed the radio waves to the rest of the antenna structure
 Data feed, a mechanism for users to receive updates from data sources
 Social media feed
 Web feed
 feed URI scheme (feed:), a non-standard URI scheme designed to facilitate subscription to web feeds
 Relay (disambiguation), any of several technologies for forwarding messages between stations
 Feed, a broadcasting signal sent from one station to another, or to or from a central facility, intended for retransmission

See also
 
 
 FEED (disambiguation)
 Feeder (disambiguation)
 Feeding (disambiguation)